Daedalia Planum is a plain on Mars located south of Arsia Mons at  and appears to be relatively featureless plain with multiple lava flows and small craters. It is mostly in the Memnonia quadrangle, but parts are in Tharsis quadrangle and Phoenicis Lacus quadrangle.  Modern imagery suggests that it may more accurately be called a "fluctus" rather than a "planum".

There is evidence that an ancient 4500 km-diameter impact basin formed in the Noachian epoch may be centered in Daedalia Planum.

References

Plains on Mars
Memnonia quadrangle
Tharsis quadrangle
Phoenicis Lacus quadrangle